Aspria Holdings BV is the owner and operator of eight members' clubs for culture, business, sport and well-being in continental Europe.  The Group's Head Office is based in Wimbledon, South West London.  Aspria currently provides services to c. 40,000 adult and children members in addition to overnight guests and day spa visitors in Belgium, Germany and Italy.

History 
 March 2000 –  The Group is founded.
 June 2001 – Aspria opens its first club on rue de l’Industrie in the European Quarter of Brussels.
 Sept / Oct 2002 – Aspria takes the concept to Germany and opens clubs in Hamburg and Berlin.
 Jan 2005 – Aspria opens in Avenue Louise, Brussels
 April 2005 – Aspria develops Royal La Rasante, one of Brussels’ oldest clubs. Founded in 1902 as a hockey and tennis club, Royal La Rasante has a successful history in national and international sport.
 April 2009 – Their third in Germany, Aspria opens in Hannover with 20 rooms for guests to stay overnight and the Groups’ first full day spa.
 October 2009 – The Aspria Hotel opens in Berlin with 42 rooms and an extended day spa.
 December 2009 – Aspria acquires the Harbour Club Milano and renames it Aspria Harbour Club.
 2011 - Expansion of Aspria Royal La Rasante in Brussels offering 16 rooms and 3 suites
 March 2012 - Aspria opens Aspria Uhlenhorst in Hamburg
 June 2015 - re-structuring of Group Shareholding structure

Sport and spa
Each club is individual and offers a different range of facilities according to location.  In all clubs, members and guests can train on endurance and strength apparatus, alone or with a personal trainer, and participate in group classes. The larger clubs schedule more than 150 weekly classes. Some clubs offer functional training studios and equipment and all clubs have at least one swimming pool.  Outdoor and indoor tennis, sports halls and beach volleyball complete the offer.  Aspria's spa offering plays a central role within the Group and services include saunas, steam baths, hamam, rasul, massages, facial and body treatments and solarium.  Via Aspria Academy, children have their own sports activities, coaching, creativity workshops and holiday camps.  A crèche service is available for babies older than 12 weeks.  Up to the age of 14 years, children can take part in children’s sports classes, thereafter joining the adult classes and – after instruction – can train on selected wellbeing equipment.

Lodges and hotels
In 2009, Aspria expanded its facilities to include overnight accommodation.  Their first project was the Aspria Lodge in Hannover which offers 20 lake-side rooms which are available to all Aspria members and members of partner organisations, such as Fdv (Fitnessverband), DSSV (Deutscher Sport Studio Verband) and IHRSA (International Health, Racquet and Sportsclub Association).  In October 2009, Aspria Berlin was expanded to offer 42 rooms as well as conference and meeting facilities later that year and Royal La Rasante, in Brussels, underwent expansion to include 16 rooms and 3 suites.  In 2012, Aspria Uhlenhorst (Hamburg) was successfully launched offering 48 rooms and is widely considered to be one of the finest club developments in Europe.

Logo
The Aspria logo is made up of the "A" signet and the associated word marque.

External links
 
 Brussels Express
 Brussels Express
 Cheeseweb

Travel and holiday companies of the United Kingdom
Companies based in the London Borough of Merton